Asakura Station (朝倉駅) is the name of several train stations in Japan:

 Asakura Station (Aichi) in Aichi Prefecture
 Asakura Station (JR Shikoku) in Kōchi Prefecture
 Asakura Station (Tosa Electric Railway) in Kōchi Prefecture